CSS Drewry was a gunboat of the Confederate States Navy during the American Civil War. This wooden gunboat had a foredeck protected by an iron V-shaped shield. Classed as a tender, she was attached to Flag Officer French Forrest's James River Squadron sometime in 1863 with Master Lewis Parrish, CSN, in command.

In addition to transporting troops and other routine service, she took part in several engagements along the river prior to January 24, 1865, when, in Trent's Reach, she was destroyed by two shots from a 100-pounder rifle in a battery of the 1st Connecticut Artillery. The second hit exploded her magazine as she assisted CSS Richmond to get afloat; all but two of her crew had reached safety before the explosion.

Commanders 
The commanders of the CSS Drewry were:

 William Harwar Parker (May-fall 1862)
 Master Lewis Parrish (around October 1863-May 1864)
 Lieutenant William B. Hall (May 19-May 21, 1864)
 Lieutenant William H. Wall (June 1864-January 23, 1865)

See also
 Battle of Trent's Reach

Notes

References
 
 Coski, John M. Capital Navy: The Men, Ships and Operations of the James River Squadron, Campbell, CA: Savas Woodbury Publishers, 1996, 

 

Drewry
Shipwrecks of the James River
Shipwrecks of the American Civil War
1863 ships
Maritime incidents in January 1865
Hampton-class gunboats